Kennard-Dale High School is a mid-sized, rural, public high school located at 393 Main Street, Fawn Grove, Pennsylvania in York County. The High School is the sole high school in the South Eastern School District. According to the National Center for Education Statistics, in 2010, Kennard-Dale High School reported an enrollment of 936 pupils in grades 9th through 12th. Kennard-Dale High School mascot is a Ram. The school colors are blue and gold.

In 2012, Kennard-Dale High School reported employing 78 teachers, yielding a student–teacher ratio of 12:1.

Extracurriculars
South Eastern School District's students have access to a variety of clubs, activities and an extensive sports program.

Sports

Boys
Baseball – AAA
Basketball – AAAS
Cross Country – AA
Football – AAAA
Golf – AAA
Lacrosse – AAAA
Soccer – AA
Track and Field – AAA
Volleyball – AA
Wrestling – AAA

Girls
Basketball – AAAA
Cross Country – AA
Field Hockey – AA
Golf – AAA
Lacrosse – AAAA
Soccer (Fall) – AA
Softball – AAA
Girls' Tennis – AAA
Track and Field – AAA
Volleyball – AA

Notable alumni
John Stefanowicz, American Greco-Roman wrestler.

References

Public high schools in Pennsylvania
Schools in York County, Pennsylvania